Sarnów  ( or Reichsheim) is a village in the administrative district of Gmina Tuszów Narodowy, within Mielec County, Subcarpathian Voivodeship, in south-eastern Poland.

The village was established in the course of Josephine colonization by German Lutheran and Calvinist settlers in 1783. They build a church which became a religious centre of Protestants in the nearby colonies. In 1867 the seat of the parish was moved to Czermin, Podkarpackie Voivodeship.

References

Villages in Mielec County